Banamali Dasa (1720–1793) is an Indian medieval Odia bhakta-poet & composer of Odissi music from the state of Odisha. "Dinabandhu daitari", "Kede chanda jane lo sahi" and "Manima he etiki maguni mora" are some of his notable writings that are used in Odissi. His songs are popularly sung in festivals, public gatherings and in Odissi dance. Banamali's compositions (especially chaupadis and jananas) are set to traditional Odissi ragas and talas & are extremely popular in the Odissi music repertoire. He is considered to be the foremost poet of the medieval Odia bhakti-literature Started with writing rustic devotional Poetry, he later began to compose "bhakti"-poetry which gained larger acceptance and popularity among the other contemporary poets of his time. Typically, his poems are eyewitness accounts, and their simple, fervent language is much appreciated.

Early life 
As Dasa's birth and death are unrecorded various researchers speculate various years. In a research publication, researcher Janaki Ballabh Mohanty has cited his birth year around 1720-30 and death year as unknown whereas in other publications has his birth year as 1720 and death year as 1793.

He was born in a Karana family, what is proved by one of his earlier poems where he explicitly mentions his surname Pattanayaka, used by the karanas (scribes) of ancient Odisha. The surname is in use till now.

He spent most of his life in Puri.

Music 
Banamali's creations are frequently sung in classical Odissi music concerts & enacted in the abhinaya part of Odissi dance. He is known to have composed over 400 songs, Odissi, Chhanda, Bhajana, Janana, Chautisa and more. He is not known to have written any single kavya, rather a huge number of individual songs. The Ragas used by Banamali in his works are unique ragas of the Odissi music tradition. Some of them are

Asabari, Bangala, Bangalasri, Baradi, Basanta, Basanta Kedara, Bhairaba, Bhairabi, Bhatiari, Bhupala, Bibhasha, Chakra Kedara, Chinta Kedara, Dakhina Kamodi, Desa Baradi, Desakhya, Dhanasri, Dhipa, Gadamalia, Gujjari, Jayanta, Jayanti, Jhinjoti, Kalyana, Kamodi, Kaphi, Karnata, Kasmira, Kedara, Kedaragouda, Khambaja, Khanda Bangalasri, Kolahala, Kousika, Krusna Kedara, Kumbha Kamodi, Kumbha Kedara, Kusuma Kedara, Lalita Kamodi, Lalita Kedara, Madana Kedara, Madhusri, Malaba, Mangala, Mangala Baradi, Mangala Kedara, Marua, Matiari, Mohana, Mohana Kedara, Mukhabari, Nalinigouda, Natakurangi, Paraja, Pattamanjari, Punnaga, Purabi, Ranabije, Rasakadamba, Rasakedara, Saberi, Sankarabharana, Saranga, Sauri, Sindhu Kamodi, Soka Kamodi, Sri, Suratha, Todi, Todiparaja.

Selected works

Poetry 
 "Dinabandhu daitari"
 "Manima he eitiki maguni mora"
 "Kede chanda jane lo sahi"
 "Dukhanasana he sukha na paili dine"
 "Jaya Jagannatha he Jasoda kumara"
 "Ke Murali Bajauchhi Brundabane Go"

References 

18th-century births
18th-century deaths
Odia-language poets
18th-century Indian poets
Poets from Odisha
Indian male poets
18th-century male writers
Odissi music composers